Giovanni Licata (18 February 1997) is an Italian rugby union player. His usual position is as a Flanker, and he currently plays for Zebre	

Under contract with Fiamme Oro, for 2017–18 Pro14 season, Licata named like Permit Player for Zebre.

In 2016 and 2017 Licata was named in the Italy Under 20 squad  and from 2017 he was also named in the Italy squad for Autumn International tests.

References

External links
 
ESPN Profile
Ultimate Rugby Profile

1997 births
Living people
Italian rugby union players
Italy international rugby union players
Rugby union flankers
Fiamme Oro Rugby players
Zebre Parma players
People from Agrigento